Robert Delort (born 21 September 1932) is a French professeur agrégé trained at the École Normale Supérieure (ENS) in the early 1950s, historian and medievalist specialised in the history of the Republic of Venice, economic history and environmental history. He is particularly interested in the history of relationships between man and animals, as part of the “zoohistory”.

Career 
Delort was educated at ENS since 1953, where he prepared the Aggregation of History (Agrégation d’histoire) and later he defended his dissertation on medieval history at the School for Advanced Studies in the Social Sciences. He was a member of École française de Rome from 1960 to 1962. He presented his thèse d'état at Sorbonne in 1975 and completed his degree in Sciences at Paris Diderot University.

He became a professor at the lyceum of Douai and assistant professor at Sorbonne (1963–1968). He was a lecturer and professor at the Paris 8 University and École normale supérieure, then an ordinary professor at University of Geneva.

As part of his research and teaching, he has spent long periods in Berlin (Berlin Institute for Advanced Study, 1983–1984), Montreal (1987), London (1993–1994) and has given seminars or courses, in particular at Bielefeld University, in Rome, in Berlin and also in Moscow (Moscow State University, 2003).

From 1983 to 1987, he was section president of the National Commission of the CNRS.

Selected publications 
 With , Venise : Portrait historique d’une cité, Éditions du Seuil, 1971
 Life in the Middle Ages, Edita Lausanne, distributed by Universe Books, 1973
  Le commerce des fourrures en Occident a la fin du Moyan Age . 2 vols., Bibliotheque de l'Ecole francaise de Rome 1978
 Le Moyen Âge : Histoire illustrée de la vie quotidienne, Éditions du Seuil, 1983
 Les croisades, Éditions du Seuil, 1988
 Charlemagne, MA Éditions, 1989
 Les Éléphants, piliers du monde, collection « Découvertes Gallimard » (nº 93), série Histoire. Éditions Gallimard, 1990
 The Life and Lore of the Elephant, “Abrams Discoveries” series. Harry N. Abrams, 1992 (U.S. edition)
 The Life and Lore of the Elephant, ‘New Horizons’ series, Thames & Hudson, 1992 (UK edition)
 Les animaux ont une histoire, Contemporary French Fiction, 1993
 L’Histoire de l’environnement européen, Presses Universitaires de France, 2001

References 

1932 births
French medievalists
20th-century French historians
École Normale Supérieure alumni
Paris Diderot University alumni
School for Advanced Studies in the Social Sciences alumni
Living people